The 2013 elections for borough presidents were held on November 5, 2013, and coincided with elections for Mayor, Public Advocate, Comptroller, and members of the New York City Council. Primary elections were held on September 10, 2013.

Bronx Borough President
Incumbent Bronx Borough President Rubén Díaz, Jr. (D) is seeking reelection. Díaz was first elected Bronx Borough President in 2009.

Major Parties

Democratic primary

Candidates
 Rubén Díaz, Jr., incumbent Borough President
 Mark Escoffery-Bey

Results

Republican primary

Candidates
 Elizabeth Perri

Major Third Parties
Besides the Democratic and Republican parties, the Conservative, Green, Independence and Working Families parties are qualified New York parties. These parties have automatic ballot access.

Independence

Candidate
Mark Escoffery-Bey

Green Party

Candidates
 Carl Lundgren

General Election Result
Diaz won the election with 89.3% of the vote. Perri earned 7.9%, Escoffery-Bey garnered 1.6% and Lundgren received 1.1%.

Brooklyn Borough President
Incumbent Brooklyn Borough President Marty Markowitz (D) cannot run again because of term limits. Markowitz has served three terms (12 years) as Brooklyn Borough President.

Major Parties

Democratic primary

Candidates
 Eric Adams, New York State Senator

Withdrew
 Domenic Recchia, New York City Councilman
 Carlo Scissura, president of the Brooklyn Chamber of Commerce and former chief of staff to Marty Markowitz.

Disqualified
 John Gangemi, former New York City Councilman (petition signatures ruled invalid)

Declined
 Letitia James, New York City Councilwoman (running for Public Advocate) 
 Brad Lander, New York City Councilman
 N. Nick Perry, New York City Councilman
 Daniel Squadron, State Senator (running for Public Advocate)

Major Third Parties
Besides the Democratic and Republican parties, the Conservative, Green, Independence and Working Families parties are qualified New York parties. These parties have automatic ballot access.

Conservative
Elias J. Weir.

General Election Result
Adams won the election with 90.8% of the vote. Weir garnered 9.2%.

Manhattan Borough President
Incumbent Manhattan Borough President Scott Stringer (D) is not seeking reelection but is instead running for New York City Comptroller in the 2013 election.

Major Parties

Democratic primary

Candidates
 Gale Brewer, New York City Councilwoman
 Robert Jackson, New York City Councilman
 Jessica Lappin, New York City Councilwoman
 Julie Menin, former chair of the Manhattan Community Board 1 in Lower Manhattan

Polling

 * Internal poll for Gale Brewer campaign

Results

Republican primary

Candidates
 David Casavis

Minor Third Party
Any candidate not among the qualified New York parties must petition their way onto the ballot; they do not face primary elections.

Libertarian Party

Candidates
 David Casavis

General election
Brewer won the election with 82.9% of the vote. Casavis garnered 17.1%.

Queens Borough President
Incumbent Queens Borough President Helen Marshall (D) could not run again due to term limits. Marshall has served three terms (12 years) as Queens Borough President.

Major Parties

Democratic primary

Candidates
 Tony Avella, state senator
 Everly Brown
 Melinda Katz, former New York City Councilwoman
 Peter Vallone, Jr., New York City Councilman

Withdrew
 Jose Peralta, State Senator
 Leroy Comrie, New York City Councilman

Results

Republican primary

Candidates
 Aurelio Arcabascio

Minor Third Party
Any candidate not among the six qualified New York parties must petition their way onto the ballot; they do not face primary elections.

Other
Everly Brown

General Election Result
Katz won the election with 80.3% of the vote. Arcabascio garnered 17.1% and Brown earned 2.6%.

Staten Island Borough President
Incumbent Staten Island Borough President James Molinaro (C) cannot run again because of term limits. Molinaro has served three terms (12 years) as Staten Island Borough President.

Major Parties

Republican primary

Candidates
 James Oddo, New York City Councilman

Democratic primary

Candidates
 Louis Liedy

Disqualified
 Richard Luthman (didn't collect enough petition signatures)

Major third parties
Besides the Democratic and Republican parties, the Conservative, Green, Independence and Working Families parties are qualified New York parties. These parties have automatic ballot access.

Green Party

Candidates
 Henry Bardel

Minor third parties
Any candidate not among the qualified New York parties must petition their way onto the ballot; they do not face primary elections.

Libertarian Party

Candidates
 Silas Johnson

General Election Result
Oddo won the election with 69.1% of the vote. Liedy garnered 29.7%, Bardel earned .7% and Johnson received .5% of the vote.

See also
 Borough President
 Government of New York City

References

Elections, 2013
2013 New York (state) elections
2013 in New York City